The Order of Merit is a Lebanese order of merit established on 16 January 1922.

History 
The Lebanese Order of Merit was created by decision No. 1080 (dated 16 January 1922) and is regulated by the code of decorations decree (Law 122 dated 12 June 1959).

Recipients 

Extraordinary Grade
 Akihito
 Abdullah II of Jordan
 Maria Barroso
 Jean-Bédel Bokassa
 Elizabeth II
 Juan Carlos I of Spain
 Isaac Kalonji
 Jules Fontaine Sambwa
 Queen Sofía of Spain
Grand Cordons
 Mounir Abou Fadel
 Qaboos bin Said
 Felipe VI of Spain
 Jassim bin Hamad bin Khalifa Al Thani
 Princess Lalla Meryem of Morocco
 Queen Letizia of Spain
 Mahathir Mohamad
 Queen Sofía of Spain
1st Grade
 Nadhmi Auchi
 Ardem Patapoutian
 Édouard Guillaud
 François al-Hajj
 Michel Suleiman
2nd Grade
 Michel Suleiman
3rd Grade
 François al-Hajj
 Michel Suleiman
Other or Unknown Grades
 Maha Bayrakdar
 Emile Boustany
 Alice Delysia
 Fairuz
 Moustafa Farroukh
 Faten Hamama
 Jesse B. Jackson
 Aram Karamanoukian
 Stanley Kerr
 Duraid Lahham
 Ahmed Rami (poet)
 Anissa Rawda Najjar
 Asad Rustum
 Ali Wehbi
 Mayyas

Dignities and classes

This order consists of two dignities and four ordinary classes as follows:

 Extraordinary Grade, for heads of state (Photo)
 Grand Cordon for Prime Ministers, royalties and other dignitaries (Photo)
 First grade 
 Second grade 
 Third grade 
 Fourth grade

Sources 
 Medals of the World, Orders, decorations, and medals of Lebanon
 Global Security Lebanese Order of Merit

Orders, decorations, and medals of Lebanon
Merit (Lebanon), Order of
 
Orders of merit
Awards established in 1922